The 1983 Kvalserien was the ninth edition of the Kvalserien. It determined which team of the participating ones would play in the 1983–84 Elitserien season and which three teams would play in the 1983–84 Swedish Division 1 season.

Tournament

External links
Tournament on hockeyarchives.info

Kvalserien
Kval